Heliotropium wagneri is a species of plant in the family Boraginaceae. It is endemic to Yemen.  Its natural habitats are subtropical or tropical dry shrubland and subtropical or tropical dry lowland grassland.

References

Endemic flora of Socotra
wagneri
Vulnerable plants
Taxonomy articles created by Polbot